No Players Online is a short horror game released on Itch.io, a website for distributing indie games. It was created by Belgian university students Adam Pype and Ward D'Heer and sound designer Viktor Kraus as part of the Haunted PS1 Jam in November 2019. Initially intended to be a twenty-minute horror game, the developers continued to expand the game into an alternate reality game (ARG) involving cryptic messages and secret passcodes. Players quickly solved the ARG on a dedicated Discord server.

No Players Online received positive reviews from critics, who praised the atmosphere, horror, and PS1-reminiscent graphics. Outlets such as Bloody Disgusting and The Verge praised the short length of the game and the nostalgia it evoked.

Plot 
A VHS tape titled "Capture the Flag Project" appears on the player's desktop.  Clicking on the tape brings up a menu screen similar to an MS-DOS, and a selection of empty multiplayer servers. Each server is a capture-the-flag game of a first-person shooter (FPS) with PS1-style graphics. After capturing the first flag, a record player begins to play, and an aggressive, shadowy figure begins to appear throughout the map.  

Before the player can capture the final flag, John, the developer of the game, appears in chat, revealing that the game is an attempt to resurrect his dead wife, the shadowy figure who is stuck in a state of limbo, and that he has been working on the game for eleven years. He pleads with the player not to finish the game, as it would shut down the servers and destroy his work. The player can either leave the game or finish it, after which they will be kicked out. The main game takes around fifteen to twenty minutes to complete.

Development 
No Players Online was created by designer Adam Pype and Ward D'Heer, two students at the Digital Arts and Entertainment game school of Hogeschool West-Vlaanderen (HOWEST) in Belgium. The sound designer is Viktor Kraus. The game was developed for the Haunted PS1 Jam, a game jam where entries are horror games with PS1-style graphics. Pype was inspired to develop the game while undertaking a level design course, where he walked around his empty maps, believing that such an atmosphere was a potential premise for a horror game. No Players Online took the developers four days to complete, and it was released on Itch.io in November 2019. It was part of Pype's commitment to release one game every month.

Alternate reality game 
As an easter egg, Pype added an additional line if the player manages to replay the game, typically through entering the Konami Code. After players found the easter egg and began thinking there was more to the game, the developers gradually built on it over six days, creating an alternate reality game (ARG). A community formed around No Players Online and a Discord server dedicated to solving the ARG was created. Clues were compiled through a series of Google Docs.

Players discovered they could make an eye appear in the sky, which, when fired upon, brought up a video of arrows being drawn. After entering the arrow keys in the video, an image with a date appeared on the screen. On this date, John's email was added to the Itch.io game homepage, which generated an autoreply when contacted containing a link to another short horror Itch.io game titled EYE. After finishing EYE, another VHS tape appeared which led to another video. EYE was originally a separate project created by Pype and D'Heer. Other clues involved morse code over a hotline and a large room with walls filled with semi-legible messages, colloquially known as "the dungeon", with a computer screen and keyboard. Entering a passcode enables the player to become a "vessel" for John's wife's spirit.

The ARG ended after players deciphered a set of coordinates in a Belgian forest; one server member went to the forest and found a poem representing the end of the journey. According to Pype, the ARG was solved very quickly. In an interview with PCGamer, Pype said that the ARG was made up as it went on. He joined the Discord server before his name was in the credits of the game and assisted with the final portion of the ARG. He also discussed balancing the difficulty of the ARG, noting that some elements were data mined from the game's code by players rather than solved.

Reception 
Kotaku Australia, ScreenRant, Bloody Disgusting, The Verge and Rock Paper Shotgun all noted the feeling of nostalgia and the "unnerving" atmosphere of waiting on an empty game server or dead multiplayer game. The latter three praised the buildup of unease. The Verge and Bloody Disgusting praised No Players Online's short length and atmosphere, as well as the sense of unease. Neither review mentioned the ARG. Aaron Boehm of Bloody Disgusting said that the story had a "surprising emotional core" despite believing that the reveal was handled quickly. Boehm added that, although the current game worked, it could be expanded and have a "more patient buildup."

Rock Paper Shotgun and Boehm both felt that, excluding the atmosphere, the horror was inadequate and cliché. They also noted that the framing of the VHS tape juxtaposed with playing the FPS "doesn’t quite match with the rest of the game’s theme." However, Boehm praised the "lo-fi" aesthetic. The Verge and Rock Paper Shotgun praised the level design as "claustraphobic" and reminiscent of FPSs from the 1990s, but Boehm wished for the level to be expanded. None of these reviews, save for Kotaku's, mention the ARG.

Mikhail Klimentov of The Washington Post described the game as "difficult" to review due to the ARG. He called the ending to the main game a "fine conclusion" considering its length and called the work put into the ARG and the community's "subsequent sleuthing work" astonishing, but said the story was "dispelled by explanation." In contrast to other reviews, Klimentov said that No Players Online was "fuzzy and noncommittal" in conveying the era its aesthetic attempts to evoke. He said the scariest element of the game was the theme of "time slipping through your fingers", that John had worked on the game for eleven years and it was barely finished. Klimentov adds that although the ARG, the game's final layer, is "fascinating", it does not matter if most players miss it, highlighting the role of the players and community in completing the game in full. PCGamer praised the ARG, saying "[No Players Online] would capture the imaginations of amateur internet sleuths—and create a spooky metagame that Hideo Kojima would envy."

Tanner Fox of ScreenRant ranked No Players Online on their list of "10 Scariest Walking Simulators".

References

External links 

 No Players Online on Itch.io
2010s horror video games
2019 video games
Alternate reality games
Indie video games
Linux games
Video games developed in Belgium
Windows games